Sako Chivitchian (born March 11, 1984) is an Armenian-born American mixed martial arts (MMA) fighter who competes in the lightweight division. He emigrated to the United States and is based in Los Angeles. A full-time professional MMA competitor since 2009, Chivitchian mostly competed in his regional circuit of California before signing with the Ultimate Fighting Championship to appear on The Ultimate Fighter: Team GSP vs. Team Koscheck.

Mixed martial arts career

Early career
Chivitchian began training in judo at the age of six with his uncle Gokor Chivichyan; he has won a total of eleven U.S. national titles including junior titles in 2000 and 2001, and two junior Olympic championships. In 2001–2002, he was named the United States Judo Federation's National Youth Male Athlete of the Year. He has placed first and third in the Junior U.S. Open Judo Championships. He also competed in the 2002 World Junior Championships in South Korea, where he lost his only match.

In addition to judo, Chivitchian took up wrestling, and by age 14 had placed second at the California State Championships and third at the Freestyle State Championships. He next took up mixed martial arts (MMA) and won his inaugural fight (at age 15) in 98 seconds by armbar. Chivitchian's opponent in his first fight was Timothy Morris, who has previously lost to teammate Manny Gamburyan. In the years following, he took up jiu-jitsu and boxing.

Chivitchian was involved in a shooting at age 19, after he and his friends were jumped by a gang. Chivitchian suffered a gunshot wound to his leg which made him temporarily unable to train, prompting his move to college and into real estate.

Chivitchian trains in Glendale, California at the Hayastan Studio, alongside The Ultimate Fighter 5 runner-up and World Extreme Cagefighting featherweight contender Manny Gamburyan.

Despite having first fought professionally in MMA in 1999, Chivitchian did not take up fighting full-time until 2009. He won his return bout in January 2009 by technical knockout (TKO) and achieved a submission victory two months later. In October 2009, Chivitchian won a further fight via submission, before claiming a split decision victory in December.

The Ultimate Fighter
Chivitchian then signed with the Ultimate Fighting Championship (UFC) to appear on The Ultimate Fighter: Team GSP vs. Team Koscheck. He competed on the debut episode against Toby Grear, taking a unanimous decision victory. In the next episode, the team picks were made and Josh Koscheck selected Chivitchian as his third pick (fifth overall).

Chivitchian faced Dane Sayers in his opening round matchup. His performance was criticised for grabbing the fence to avoid being taken down on multiple occasions, yet he was not penaised with any point deduction. Chivitchian won the fight by unanimous decision as all three judges scored the fight 20–18.

In the quarter finals, Chivitchian faced Jonathan Brookins. Brookins was able to throw Chivitchian to the mat, which forced Chivitchian to try to stand up. Brookins then got hooks in and worked for a rear naked choke, eventually sealing it soon after, eliminating Chivitchian from the competition.

Ultimate Fighting Championship
Chivitchian made his UFC debut at The Ultimate Fighter: Team GSP vs. Team Koscheck Finale against Kyle Watson and lost by unanimous decision (30–27, 30–27, 29–28). He along with Aaron Wilkinson was released from the promotion.

Mixed martial arts record

|-
|Win
|align=center|8–1
|Dominique Chisem
|Submission
|Xplode Fight Series - Summer Fight Night 3
|
|align=center|2
|align=center|1:10
|Twentynine Palms, California, United States
|
|-
|Win
|align=center|7–1
|Tony Lewis
|Submission (rear-naked choke)
|Gladiator Challenge - Battleground
|
|align=center|1
|align=center|0:40
|San Jacinto, California, United States
|
|-
|Win
|align=center|6–1
|Preston Scharf
|Decision (split)
|Lights Out Promotions - Chaos at the Casino
|
|align=center|3
|align=center|5:00
|Inglewood, California, United States
|
|-
|Loss
|align=center|5–1
|Kyle Watson
|Decision (unanimous)
|The Ultimate Fighter 12 Finale
|
|align=center|3
|align=center|5:00
|Las Vegas, Nevada, United States
|
|-
|Win
|align=center|5–0
|Marcos Gonzalez
|Decision (split)
|NFAMMA - Resurrection
|
|align=center|3
|align=center|3:00
|Ventura, California, United States
|
|-
|Win
|align=center|4–0
|Sergio Salcido
|Submission (armbar)
|Long Beach Fight Night 6
|
|align=center|1
|align=center|1:28
|Long Beach, California, United States
|
|-
|Win
|align=center|3–0
|Frank Baldivia
|Submission (rear-naked choke)
|California Xtreme Fighting
|
|align=center|1
|align=center|1:28
|El Monte, California, United States
|
|-
|Win
|align=center|2–0
|Noe Rodriguez
|TKO (punches)
|California Xtreme Fighting
|
|align=center|3
|align=center|0:14
|El Monte, California, United States
|
|-
|Win
|align=center|1–0
|Timothy Morris
|Submission (armbar)
|Kage Kombat 14
|
|align=center|1
|align=center|1:38
|Los Angeles, California, United States
|

Mixed martial arts exhibition record

|-
|Lose
|align=center|2-1
| Jonathan Brookins
|Submission (rear-naked choke)
|The Ultimate Fighter: Team GSP vs. Team Koscheck
|
|align=center|1
|align=center|2:05
|Las Vegas, Nevada, United States
|
|-
|Win
|align=center|2-0
| Dane Sayers
|Decision (unanimous)
|The Ultimate Fighter: Team GSP vs. Team Koscheck
|
|align=center|2
|align=center|5:00
|Las Vegas, Nevada, United States
|
|-
|Win
|align=center|1-0
| Toby Grear
|Decision (unanimous)
|The Ultimate Fighter: Team GSP vs. Team Koscheck
|
|align=center|2
|align=center|5:00
|Las Vegas, Nevada, United States
|
|-

References

External links

 Sako Chivitchian's Official Site
HyeFighters - Armenian Combat Sports Athletes

1984 births
Living people
Armenian male mixed martial artists
Lightweight mixed martial artists
Mixed martial artists utilizing judo
Armenian male judoka
Armenian emigrants to the United States
Armenian American
Sportspeople from Glendale, California